Francis John Fennelly (February 18, 1860 – August 4, 1920) was a 19th-century Major League Baseball shortstop.  He played his entire career for American Association teams: the Washington Nationals (1884), Cincinnati Red Stockings (1884–1888), Philadelphia Athletics (1888–1889), and Brooklyn Gladiators (1890).  He stood  (1.73 m) and weighed 168 pounds (76.5 kg).

In his rookie season of 1884 he hit .311, good for eighth in the league, and his .367 on-base percentage ranked fourth.  He led the league in games played (112) and runs batted in (89) in 1885.

Fennelly finished in the league Top Ten twice for runs and slugging percentage, three times for home runs and RBI, four times for triples, and five times for bases on balls.

The best team he ever played for was the 1887 Red Stockings, who had a record of 81–54 (.600) and finished second in the league, 14 games behind the St. Louis Browns.

Career totals for 786 games played include 781 hits, 34 home runs, 408 RBI, 609 runs scored, and a batting average of .257.

His career OPS+ (118) and Win Shares per 162 games (25.35) are both better than Derek Jeter.

Fennelly died and was buried in his hometown of Fall River, Massachusetts at the age of 60.

See also
 List of Major League Baseball annual runs batted in leaders
 List of Major League Baseball career stolen bases leaders

External links
Baseball Reference
Retrosheet

19th-century baseball players
Major League Baseball shortstops
Baseball players from Massachusetts
Washington Nationals (AA) players
Cincinnati Red Stockings (AA) players
Philadelphia Athletics (AA) players
Brooklyn Gladiators players
1860 births
1920 deaths
Camden Merritts players
Brooklyn Grays (Interstate Association) players
Fall River Indians players
Portland (minor league baseball) players